Joshua David Coulson (born 28 January 1989) is an English professional footballer who plays as a centre-back for National League North club King's Lynn Town.

Career

Cambridge United
Born in Cambridge, Cambridgeshire, Coulson played for local side Cherry Hinton Lions before joining Cambridge City and playing in the Youth Development squad for the 2005–06 season. He then went with Jez George (a former Director of Cambridge City) to Cambridge United's youth squad. He made his first team debut for Cambridge United on 6 October 2007, as a substitute in a 2–2 home draw with Halifax Town.

Coulson scored his first senior goal on 16 March 2010, netting his side's first of a 3–1 home success against Salisbury. He featured regularly for the side in the following campaigns, becoming a popular figure amongst supporters, and signed a new two-and-a-half-year deal on 12 February 2014.

Coulson won the FA Trophy and the Conference Premier play-offs in the 2013–14 season with Cambridge United.

On 9 August 2014 Coulson played his first match in the Football League, starting and scoring the game's only goal against Plymouth Argyle.

Leyton Orient
On 28 July 2017 Coulson signed for Leyton Orient initially on a six-month loan spell. On 8 January, Coulson joined permanently after 10 years at Cambridge.

Southend United
On 9 June 2021, Coulson signed for Southend United.

Kings Lynn Town
On 5 February 2022, Coulson joined National League side King's Lynn Town on a one-month loan deal. Coulson joined the club on a permanent basis in May 2022 having spent the second half of the season on loan.

Career statistics

Honours

Club
Cambridge United
FA Trophy: 2013–14
Conference Premier play-offs: 2014

Leyton Orient
National League: 2018–19
FA Trophy runner-up: 2018–19

References

External links

Josh Coulson profile at Cambridge United F.C.

1989 births
Living people
Sportspeople from Cambridge
English footballers
Association football defenders
Cambridge United F.C. players
Leyton Orient F.C. players
Southend United F.C. players
King's Lynn Town F.C. players
National League (English football) players
English Football League players